The 2019 United Kingdom general election was held on 12 December 2019. These were the target seats for each of the political parties, according to results from the previous election in 2017.

List by party

Conservative

Labour

Liberal Democrat

SNP

Plaid Cymru

Brexit Party

Green Party of England and Wales

Democratic Unionist Party

Ulster Unionist Party

SDLP

Sinn Féin

References

2019 United Kingdom general election
Lists of marginal seats in the United Kingdom by election